New Orleans Nightcrawlers are a Regional roots group based in the New Orleans area. They were founded in 1994 by pianist Tom McDermott, sousaphonist Matt Perrine and trumpeter Kevin Clark.  In addition, original members of the band included trumpeter Barney Floyd, Frank Oxley, Mark Morris, and Peter Kaplan on percussion, Craig Klein and Rick Trolsen on trombones, and saxophonists Eric Traub, Ken "Snakebite" Jacobs and Jason Mingledorff and trumpeter Satoru Ohashi.  More recent members of the band have included saxophonist Brent Rose and drummer Tanio Hingle and Kerry “fatman” Hunter. Originally modeled on the Dirty Dozen Brass Band, the Crawlers brought something new to the New Orleans brass band scene with their sophisticated arrangements. Henry Butler, Evan Christopher, and Troy (Trombone Shorty) and Bruce Hornsby have performed/recorded with the group.   They have toured Japan, Brazil, several countries in Europe and much of America, and have released five albums. Their latest album, Atmosphere, won the 2020 Grammy Award for Best Regional Roots Music Album.

Discography
New Orleans Nightcrawlers (Rounder Records)
Funknicity (Rounder Records)
Live at the Old Point
Slither Slice (Threadhead Records)
Atmosphere (Threadhead Records)

References

External links
[ All Music]

American jazz ensembles from New Orleans
Musical groups from New Orleans
Grammy Award winners
Southland Records artists